Vefa SK is a football club in Vefa, neighborhood of the Fatih (Eminönü between 1928 and 2008) district of Istanbul.  The team currently competing at Bölgesel Amatör Lig 8th Grup which is 5th level of Turkish leagues.  Vefa SK is the first and only Turkish club coached by a female manager, Özgür Gözüaçık Akyıldız.

History

The club was founded in 1908 when Turkish football was legalized.  The club was formed by the students from Vefa Idadisi (Vefa College), Saim Turgut Aktansel, Zeki (Baban), Hikmet (Barlan), Rıfat (Baban), Sudi Cavit (Oral), Tevfik (Kut), Yusuf Ziya and Sabri Beyler as Vefa Idman Yurdu. Following foundation of the Republic of Turkey, club's name change into Vefa Spor Klubu (Vefa Sport Club).

They played in the İstanbul League until the establishment of the Süper Lig in 1959, for which they qualified. Vefa were relegated to the Second League (2. Lig) first time in 1962–63. They became the champions of the second league in 1964–65. They were relegated again in 1973–74. They stayed in the second league until 1986–87 season. They were relegated from 3rd division to amateur league in 1993–94. They played in the third league in 1998–99 and 1999–2000 seasons. Today they play in the amateur leagues. Their ground is the 6,000 capacity Vefa Stadı. Vefa finished İstanbul 4th Group of Super Amateur as champions and qualified to play-offs for Regional Amateur League. They finished it as 6th  and qualified to Regional Amateur League play-outs. They faced with Bayrampaşa Tunaspor on 6 May 2012 and won as 3–1. Consequently, they promoted to Regional Amateur League (RAL) for 2012–13 season. They finished 9rd group of RAL as 2nd and didn't qualify to promotion play-off. They finished 11th group of RAL as 8th, but they relegated to Istanbul Super Amateur due to Vefa finished below Dikilitaş, which was another Istanbul team according to RAL rules in 2013–14 season. Vefaspor finished 1st Group of Istanbul Super Amateur League as 1st and qualified to promotion play-offs in 2014–15 season. Vefaspor finished play-offs as 3rd and returned to RAL immediately.

The club's colours are green and white.

Professional League history

They played in total 14 seasons in the top Turkish league.

The first ever national professional Turkish league (called Milli Lig – National League) started in 1959. Vefa was one of the founder member of Turkish Professional League.  In 1959 Turkish Professional League was played in two stages – the Groups and the Final.  The winners of each group qualified to the second stage.  Vefa was placed in Group Red.  They just missed the final, coming second after Galatasaray.

Turkish Professional League in 1959.

 Group Red:
 1 Galatasaray A.Ş.		 20 14	7  6  1	 18   7	(Proceeds to Final)
 2 Vefa			 20 14	7  6  1	 21  10
 3 Ankara Demirspor	 16 14	4  8  2	 12  11
 4 Göztepe		 15 14	5  5  4	 23  21
 5 Fatih Karagümrük 		 12 14	4  4  6	 17  17
 6 Karşıyaka S.K.		 10 14	2  6  6	 13  21
 7 Gençlerbirliği S.K.	 10 14	1  8  5	 10  18
 8 Adalet		  9 14	1  7  6	 12  21

Adalet formed in 1946 as Adalet Gençlik Kulübü, and become Alibeyköy Adalet SK in 1971, then become Alibeyköy in 1980.

 Group White:
 1 Fenerbahçe S.K.		 26 14 12  2  0	 29   7	Proceeds to Final
 2 Beşiktaş J.K.		 18 14	8  2  4	 22  16
 3 Altay S.K.			 15 14  5  5  4	 18  16
 4 İzmirspor G.S.K.		 13 14	4  5  5	 11  12
 5 M.K.E. Ankaragücü		 13 14	5  3  6	 16  19
 6 Hacettepe S.K.		 11 14	5  1  8	 14  20
 7 Beykoz 1908 S.K.D.		 10 14	3  4  7	 17  21
 8 İstanbul S.A.Ş.		  6 14	1  4  9	  6  22
 Final: Fenerbahçe S.K. – Galatasaray A.Ş. (0–1), (4–0)

Vefa SK's all participations in the Turkish Professional League (Süper Lig) as follows;

 1959: 2nd in the Group Red, P: 20, G: 14, W: 7, D: 6, L: 1, F: 21, A: 10.
 1959–60: 11th place, P: 335, G: 38, W: 11, D: 13, L: 14, F: 37, A: 60.
 1960–61: 6th place, P: 41, G: 38, W: 13, D: 15, L: 10, F: 32, A: 39.
 1961–62: 18th place, P: 31, G: 38, W: 11, D: 9, L: 18, F: 29, A: 48.
 1962–63: 10th place in the Group White, P: 13, G: 20, W: 3, D: 7, L: 10, F: 22, A: 37, Relegated to Turkish Second Division.
 1965–66: 11th place, P: 27, G: 30, W: 9, D: 9, L: 12, F: 26, A: 36.
 1966–67: 13th place, P: 29, G: 32, W: 9, D: 11, L: 12, F: 31, A: 35.
 1967–68: 12th place, P: 29, G: 32, W: 8, D: 13, L: 11, F: 31, A: 35.
 1968–69: 13th place, P: 24, G: 30, W: 8, D: 8, L: 14, F: 27, A: 37.
 1969–70: 13th place, P: 25, G: 30, W: 7, D: 11, L: 12, F: 19, A: 28.
 1970–71: 14th place, P: 22, G: 30, W: 4, D: 14, L: 12, F: 28, A: 48.
 1971–72: 10th place, P: 28, G: 30, W: 9, D: 10, L: 11, F: 23, A: 27.
 1972–73: 14th place, P: 22, G: 30, W: 6, D: 10, L: 14, F: 22, A: 35.
 1973–74: 16th place, P: 17, G: 30, W: 5, D: 7, L: 18, F: 16, A: 39. (Relegated to Turkish Second Division)

Vefa SK's Turkish Second Division (currently known as TFF 1. League) History;

 1963–64: Second League 4th
 1964–65: Second League 1st (Promoted to First (Now Turkey Super League)
 1974–75: Second Division Group Red 15th.
 1975–76: Second Division Group White 5th.
 1976–77: Second Division Group White 8th.
 1977–78: Second Division Group White 8th.
 1978–79: Second Division Group White 4th.
 1979–80: Second Division Group B 6th.
 1980–81: Second Division Group B 9th.
 1981–82: Second Division Group A 5th.
 1982–83: Second Division Group A 8th.
 1983–84: Second Division Group B 5th.
 1984–85: Second Division Group C 8th.
 1985–86: Second Division Group C 8th.
 1986–87: Second Division Group C 16th. (Relegated to Turkish Third Division)

Current squad

. Source

Notable players

Notable supporters

 Cinema: Kemal Sunal, Şener Şen, Müjdat Gezen, Gazanfer Özcan, Erol Büyükburç, Yusuf Kurçenli, Memduh Ün.
 Media: Uğur Dündar, İslam Çupi, Sadettin Teksoy, Tuncay Pınarbaşı
 Writers: Mehmet Akif Ersoy, Yahya Kemal Beyatlı, Peyami Safa, Prof. Dr. İsmail Hakkı Baltacıoğlu, Prof. Dr. M. Şekip Tunç, Yusuf Ziya Ortaç, Adnan Adıvar, Ahmet Altan, Turan Oflazoğlu, Şevket Rado.

National players

Vefa SK players capped for Turkey national Football Team whilst playing for Vefa SK:

 Sami Açıköney: 4 caps (Poland 1–2, Poland 1–6, Bulgaria 1–5, Yugoslavia 2–0)
 Hüsamettin Böke: 2 caps (Romania 1–3, Yugoslavia 2–0)
 Hayri Ragıp Candemir: 2 caps (Romania 1–3, Poland 1–6)
 Hüseyin Saygun: 4 caps (Greece 3–1, Austria 0–1, China 4–0, Yugoslavia 1–3)
 Galip Haktanır: 5 caps (Austria 0–1, Greece 2–1, Austria 0–1, Iran 6–1, Israel 1–5)
 Melih Ilgaz: 1 cap (Iran 6–1)
 Bülent Varol: 1 cap (Iran 6–1)
 Şükrü Ersoy (goalkeeper): 1 cap (Israel 1–5)
 İsmet Yamanoğlu: 5 caps (Sweden 1–3, Switzerland 1–5, Spain 0–0, Switzerland 2–1, Yugoslavia 2–2)
 Garbis İstanbulluoğlu: 5 caps (Switzerland 1–5, Spain 0–0, Switzerland 2–1, Yugoslavia 2–2, Italy B 0–1)
 Nejat Küçüksorgunlu: 2 caps (Egypt 4–0, Poland 1–0,
 Hilmi Kiremitçi: 10 caps (Egypt 4–0, Poland 1–0, Spain 0–3, Belgium 1–1, Holland 2–1, Belgium 1–1, Romania 0–3, Romania 2–0, Holland 0–0, Bulgaria 1–2)

Vefa SK players scored for Turkey National Football Team whilst playing for Vefa SK;

 Hüseyin Saygun: 1 goal (China 4–0)
 Garbis İstanbulluoğlu: 3 goals (Switzerland 1–5, Switzerland 2–1 (2 goals))
 Hilmi Kiremitçi: 1 goal (Egypt 4–0)

Note:

 Sami Açıköney is first Vefa SK player represented Turkey National Football team on 2 October 1925 in İstanbul against Poland.
 Garbis İstanbulluoğlu is the first Vefa SK player scored for Turkey National Football Team.
 Garbis İstanbulluoğlu first capped on 1 June 1952 in Ankara against Switzerland, scored in his debut.
 Garbis İstanbulluoğlu is also the first Christian player represented Turkey National Football Team.
 Hilmi Kiremitçi also scored in his debut for Turkey against Egypt on 5 April 1957 in Al-Qairah during Mediterranean Games.  He is the last Vefa SK player represented Turkey as a Vefa SK player on 27 November 1960 in Sofija against Bulgaria.  He then moved to Fenerbahçe S.K.

League participations

 Süper Lig: 14
1959–1963, 1965–1974
 TFF First League: 15
1963–1965, 1974–1987
 TFF Second League: 9
1987–1994, 1998–2000
 Turkish Regional Amateur League: 3
2012–2014, 2015–16
 Istanbul Amateur League: 17
1994–1998, 2000–2012, 2014–15

See also
List of Turkish Sports Clubs by Foundation Dates

References

 Vefa Terbiye-i Bedeniyye Kulübü. Türk Futbol Tarihi vol.1. page(23). (June 1992) Türkiye Futbol Federasyonu Yayınları.

External links

Official website
Vefaspor on TFF.org

 
Association football clubs established in 1908
1908 establishments in the Ottoman Empire
Süper Lig clubs